The Val Johnson Incident refers to an alleged encounter by Marshall County, Minnesota Deputy Sheriff Val Johnson with a UFO in 1979.

Incident
Johnson reported that while he was on patrol near Warren, Minnesota about 2 AM on August 27, 1979 he saw a beam of light just above the road. According to Johnson, the beam sped towards him, his squad car was engulfed in light,  and he heard glass breaking. Johnson said he was unconscious for 39 minutes and when he awoke he realized his wristwatch and the vehicle's clock had stopped for 14 minutes. The windshield was shattered, a headlight and red emergency light was damaged and a thin radio aerial bent. Deputies responding to Johnson's call for help found the squad car sideways on the road. Johnson suffered bruises and eye irritation that a physician compared to "welder's burns".
When the story received national publicity, Johnson told reporters the sudden attention had caused him and his family a great deal of emotional strain. On September 11, 1979, Johnson appeared as a guest on ABC's Good Morning America program.

Responses
Ufologists, including Allan Hendry and Jerome Clark, consider the incident significant, with Clark claiming that Johnson refused to take a polygraph test because Johnson believed it "would only [serve to] satisfy people's morbid curiosity". UFO skeptic Philip Klass argued that the entire event was a hoax, and that Johnson had deliberately damaged his own patrol car.

See also
List of UFO sightings

References

External links 

 Val Johnson Incident - UFO Casebook
 Whatever happened to the Marshall County cop who hit a UFO? (includes images)
 The Strange And Intriguing Val Johnson Case (includes vehicle images)
 Intersection of Marshall County Highway 5 and Minnesota State Highway 220 - (street view at the intersection)
 Approximate location of the Val Johnson Incident - (street view)

UFO sightings in the United States
1979 in Minnesota
August 1979 events in the United States